Fjordbåtene i Brevik is a passenger ferry operator based in Porsgrunn, Norway, that provides the route Brevik–Sandøya–Bjørkøya–Brevik twenty-four times daily on contract with Vestviken Kollektivtrafikk. The company is owned by the City of Porsgrunn.

References

Ferry companies of Vestfold og Telemark